New Hartford is a town in Litchfield County, Connecticut, United States. The population was 6,658 at the 2020 census. The town center is defined by the U.S. Census Bureau as the New Hartford Center census-designated place (CDP). The town is mainly a rural community consisting of farms, homes, and parks. Brodie Park and Ski Sundown are located in New Hartford.

Geography
New Hartford is in eastern Litchfield County and is bordered by the city of Torrington to the west and Hartford County to the east and south.

Principal communities
Bakerville
Nepaug
New Hartford Center
Pine Meadow (has its own post office)

Demographics

As of the census of 2000, there were 6,088 people, 2,228 households, and 1,748 families residing in the town. The racial makeup of the town was 97.67% White, 0.64% African American, 0.05% Native American, 0.74% Asian, 0.07% Pacific Islander, 0.20% from other races, and 0.64% from two or more races. Hispanic or Latino of any race were 1.35% of the population.

There were 2,228 households, out of which 38.3% had children under the age of 18 living with them, 68.9% were married couples living together, 6.6% had a female householder with no husband present, and 21.5% were non-families. 16.4% of all households were made up of individuals, and 4.7% had someone living alone who was 65 years of age or older.  The average household size was 2.72 and the average family size was 3.07.

In the town, the population was spread out, with 26.9% under the age of 18, 4.4% from 18 to 24, 31.0% from 25 to 44, 28.7% from 45 to 64, and 8.9% who were 65 years of age or older.  The median age was 39 years. For every 100 females, there were 100.1 males.  For every 100 females age 18 and over, there were 97.6 males.

The median income for a household in the town was $69,321, and the median income for a family was $78,065. Males had a median income of $52,077 versus $36,946 for females. The per capita income for the town was $30,429.  About 1.5% of families and 1.6% of the population were below the poverty line, including none of those under age 18 and 3.1% of those age 65 or over.

Education
The town of New Hartford has three elementary schools: the New Hartford Elementary and Bakerville School have grades Kindergarten through Second Grade. The New Hartford Elementary School includes preschool classes, with most children, attending whichever school they're closest to. All children from grades three through six attend the Ann Antolini School.

Resident middle and high school students attend the Northwestern Regional District 7, located in Winsted, Connecticut. It operates Northwestern Regional Middle School and Northwestern Regional High School.

Community and recreation
New Hartford is home to Ski Sundown, a locally popular ski mountain that attracts many skiers and snowboarders in Litchfield County. It hosts several Slopestyle Competitions and winter events every year. Many other community events are held at Brodie Park, which lies on the edge of West Hill Lake, where a small beach and swimming area is welcome for New Hartford Residents. Several of the events held at Brodie Park are The Race Around The Lake, on Memorial Day weekend, several camps and concerts during the summer, a community picnic in July, and an annual children's Christmas Party held in Berkshire Hall. All other events are held in New Hartford Center, primarily the annual Light New Hartford held in early December. New Hartford is the largest town in the local area and therefore has many of the regional sports teams. Most games for baseball, softball, soccer and football are held at Brown's Corner, which is off Route 202.

Places of worship
There are six churches in New Hartford: two Congregational churches (the oldest church in the town, at New Hartford Center, and another in the village of Nepaug), an Episcopal church (at Pine Meadow), Saint Paul's Lutheran Church, a Methodist church (in the village of Bakerville), a Baptist church (Harvest Baptist) and Immaculate Conception Roman Catholic Church. There is also a Buddhist temple, at Bakerville.

Transportation

The town's main thoroughfares are U.S. Route 202 and U.S. Route 44. US 202 leads west to Torrington and east to Avon, while US 44 leads northwest to Winsted and southeast to Hartford. Connecticut Route 219 has its southern terminus at US 202 between Bakerville and Nepaug, and leads north through New Hartford Center into Barkhamsted.

Being a primarily rural town, New Hartford does not have any public transit services.

On the National Register of Historic Places 

 Philip Chapin House – 55 Church Street—An Italian Renaissance house built in 1867
 Esperanza – 511 Town Hill Road—A country estate, first built in a Greek Revival style in 1835, then expanded in a Colonial revival style between 1874 and 1893
 Pine Meadow Historic District – A collection of mid to late 18th-century houses built in the Pine Meadow area
 Sun Terrace – Route 219—A country house built in the International style, first completed in 1932.
 Gillette's Grist Mill – Maple Hollow Road—a 19th-century gristmill on the Nepaug River

Notable locations

 Ski Sundown – a ski resort
 Ovation Guitar Company
 Brewery Legitimus – a 7 barrel craft brewery and taproom

Notable people 

 Marcus H. Holcomb, 66th Governor of Connecticut 
 Ian Pisarcik, author of Before Familiar Woods

References

External links

Town of New Hartford official website
New Hartford Department Of Recreation

 
Towns in Litchfield County, Connecticut
Towns in the New York metropolitan area
Towns in Connecticut